Kalat (also Romanized as Kalāt; also known as Kalāt-e Posht-e Bāgh) is a village in Afrineh Rural District, Mamulan District, Pol-e Dokhtar County, Lorestan Province, Iran. At the 2006 census, its population was 22, in 5 families.

References 

Towns and villages in Pol-e Dokhtar County